The 1986–87 snooker season was a series of snooker tournaments played between July 1986 and May 1987. The following table outlines the results for the ranking and invitational events.


Calendar

Official rankings 

The top 16 of the world rankings, these players automatically played in the final rounds of the world ranking events and were invited for the Masters.

Notes

References

External links 
 

1986
Season 1987
Season 1986